Djurgårdsbrunns FC is a Swedish football club located in Stockholm.

Background
Djurgårdsbrunns FC currently plays in Division 4 Stockholm Mellersta which is the sixth tier of Swedish football. They play their home matches at the Essinge IP in Stockholm.

The club is affiliated to Stockholms Fotbollförbund.

Season to season

Footnotes

External links
 Djurgårdsbrunns FC – Official website

Football clubs in Stockholm